The Council of Europe Convention on the Protection of Children Against Sexual Exploitation and Sexual Abuse, also known as the Lanzarote Convention, is a Council of Europe multilateral treaty whereby states agree to criminalise certain forms of sexual abuse against children. It is the first international treaty that addresses child sexual abuse that occurs within the home or family.

Content
States that ratify the Convention agree to criminalise sexual activity with children below the legal age of consent, regardless of the context in which such behaviour occurs; it also mandates the criminalisation of child prostitution and pornography. The Convention sets out several measures to prevent child sexual exploitation and abuse, including the training and educating of children, monitoring of offenders, and the screening and training of people who are employed or volunteer to work with children.

Conclusion and entry into force
The Convention was concluded and signed on 25 October 2007 in Lanzarote, Spain. All states of the Council of Europe have signed and ratified the Convention. The last state to ratify it is Ireland, in 2020.  It came into force on 1 July 2010 after being ratified by five states.

State parties
As of 11 May 2020, the treaty has been ratified by the following 48 states:

Although it was specifically designed for states of the Council of Europe, the Convention is open to accession by any state in the world; as of 2019 it has been ratified by Tunisia.

See also
Optional Protocol on the Sale of Children, Child Prostitution and Child Pornography
European system of international human rights law
List of Council of Europe treaties

References

External links
Convention text.
Convention information page, Council of Europe.
Signatures and ratifications.

Council of Europe Convention on the Protection of Children against Sexual Exploitation and Sexual Abuse
Council of Europe Convention on the Protection of Children against Sexual Exploitation and Sexual Abuse
Child pornography law
Council of Europe Convention on the Protection of Children against Sexual Exploitation and Sexual Abuse
Council of Europe treaties
Council of Europe Convention on the Protection of Children against Sexual Exploitation and Sexual Abuse
Council of Europe Convention on the Protection of Children against Sexual Exploitation and Sexual Abuse
Treaties of Albania
Treaties of Austria
Treaties of Armenia
Treaties of Belgium
Treaties of Bosnia and Herzegovina
Treaties of Bulgaria
Treaties of Croatia
Treaties of Cyprus
Treaties of the Czech Republic
Treaties of Denmark
Treaties of Estonia
Treaties of Finland
Treaties of France
Treaties of Germany
Treaties of Georgia (country)
Treaties of Greece
Treaties of Hungary
Treaties of Iceland
Treaties of Italy
Treaties of Latvia
Treaties of Liechtenstein
Treaties of Lithuania
Treaties of Luxembourg
Treaties of North Macedonia
Treaties of Malta
Treaties of Moldova
Treaties of Monaco
Treaties of Montenegro
Treaties of the Netherlands
Treaties of Poland
Treaties of Portugal
Treaties of Romania
Treaties of Russia
Treaties of San Marino
Treaties of Serbia
Treaties of Slovakia
Treaties of Slovenia
Treaties of Spain
Treaties of Sweden
Treaties of Switzerland
Treaties of Turkey
Treaties of Ukraine
Treaties extended to Clipperton Island
Treaties extended to French Guiana
Treaties extended to French Polynesia
Treaties extended to the French Southern and Antarctic Lands
Treaties extended to Guadeloupe
Treaties extended to Martinique
Treaties extended to Mayotte
Treaties extended to New Caledonia
Treaties extended to Réunion
Treaties extended to Saint Pierre and Miquelon
Treaties extended to Wallis and Futuna
Treaties extended to the Collectivity of Saint Martin
Treaties extended to Saint Barthélemy
Childhood in Europe